The Cat in the Hat Knows a Lot About That! is a children's animated television series that premiered in 2010, on August 7 on Treehouse TV in Canada, on September 6 on PBS Kids in the United States and also in the UK on CITV and Tiny Pop. It also aired on YTV in Canada on weekday mornings from 2012 to 2013. The award-winning series is based on Random House's Beginner Books franchise and The Cat in the Hat's Learning Library, itself based on the 1957 children's book The Cat in the Hat. The series is produced by Portfolio Entertainment, Random House Children Entertainment and Collingwood O'Hare Productions in conjunction with KQED, Treehouse TV, and Kids' CBC. The series features famous celebrity Martin Short as the voice of The Cat in the Hat.

The first season has 40 half-hour episodes. PBS Kids renewed it for a second season of 20 episodes which premiered on September 10, 2012. The show went on a three-year hiatus before returning for its third and final season of 20 episodes, which premiered on March 2 and ended on October 14, 2018. 80 episodes were produced.

Overview

Each episode featured The Cat in the Hat who leads neighbors Nick and Sally, the Fish, and Thing One and Thing Two on a variety of adventures in his "Thinga-ma-jigger", a Seussian contraption that can sprout wings, pontoons, booster rockets, change size, and do just about anything else necessary to further the adventure. The adventures are prompted by a question posed by either Nick or Sally at the beginning of each episode, which inevitably leads them around the globe to make natural science discoveries. Similar to other PBS Kids shows such as Curious George and Sid the Science Kid, The Cat in the Hat Knows a Lot About That! focuses on introducing preschoolers to various science and learning concepts.

Episodes

Characters

Main
 The Cat in the Hat (voiced by Martin Short) is a knowledgeable, adventurous, anthropomorphic cat. He loves to discover the world and act as Nick and Sally's guide, and he frequently speaks in rhyming patterns reminiscent of the Dr. Seuss character on which he is based.
 Nick (voiced by Jacob Ewaniuk in seasons 1–2 and Deandray Hamilton in season 3) is Sally's next-door neighbor and best friend. He seems to replace Sally's brother from the books (who is named Conrad in the 2003 live-action film).
 Sally (voiced by Alexa Torrington in seasons 1–2 and Halle Nunes in season 3) is Nick's next-door neighbor and best friend.
 Fish (voiced by Rob Tinkler) is a moderately pessimistic fish who is loosely based on the fish in the original story. Unlike the fish in the book, however, he is red and appears to belong to the Cat instead of Sally or Nick. He is also much more cooperative in the Cat's adventures.
 Thing One and Thing Two (also voiced by Rob Tinkler) are the Cat's two zany, energetic helpers of indeterminate species. They speak their own language which sounds like incoherent gibberish.

Supporting
 Sally's mother (voiced by Tracey Hoyt) appears in some episodes. Whenever Sally asks permission to go on an adventure with the Cat, the answering voice is heard.
 Nick's mother (also voiced by Tracey Hoyt) appears in some episodes. Whenever Nick asks permission to go on an adventure with the Cat, the answering voice is heard; she speaks with a Caribbean accent.

Home media
NCircle Entertainment released various DVDs beginning in late October 2010, each being in region 1, subtitled in English and Spanish, approximately 60 minutes (except for a few, in Dolby Digital, in 5.1 surround and Dolby surround stereo in Spanish); each has the bonus segments from the show.

 Wings and Things
 Show Me the Honey
 Migration Vacation
 I Love the Nightlife
 Oh Give Me a Home  
 Many Ants Make Light Work
 Up and Away
 A Plan for Sand
 Whale Music
 Flower Power
 Dress Up Day
 Bath Time
 Tales About Tails
 A Sticky Situation
 Trees Company
 Rain Game
 You Should Be Dancing
 A Tale About Tails
 Told from the Cold
 Snowman's Land
 Flight of the Penguin
 A Long Winter's Nap
 Reindeer Games
 Surprise, Little Guys 
 Super Secret Digger
 Night Lights
 Along Came a Spider
 Teeny Weeny Adventure
 Hold On Tight
 Trick and Treats 
 Batty for Bats
 Aye Aye
 Trick or Treat
 Breeze from the Trees
 Nest Best Thing
 The Lost Egg
 The Tree Doctor
 Miles and Miles of Reptiles
 Now You See Me
 Be Cool
 Itty Bitty Water
 Ocean Commotion!
 Reef Magic
 Digging The Deep
 King Cecil the Seahorse
 Ice Is Nice
 Help with Kelp
 Safari, So Good!
 Treetop Tom
 Stripy Safari
 The King of Swing
 Elephant Walk
 Follow the Prints
 Let's Go on an Adventure
 Maps
 Incredible Journey
 I See Seeds
 Sniff and Seek
 Go Snails Go
 Space is the Place
 Jumping on the Moon
 No Night Today
 Planet Name Game
 Top of the Sky
 Tough Enough
 The Cat in the Hat Knows a Lot About Halloween!

Awards
 2012 Parents' Choice Award – Winner in Television 
 2012 Cynopsis: Kids !magination Awards – Winner, TV Series based on books 
 2012 Cynopsis: Kids !magination Awards – Winner, Song for a TV Series 
 2012 Kidscreen Awards – Recognized, Best Integrated Promotion 
 2012 Teachers' Choice Awards – For the Classroom: "Wings and Things" (DVD NCircle Entertainment) 
 2012 Young Artist Awards – Nominated, Best Performance in a Voice-Over, TV or Feature Film Young Actor
 2012 Parents' Choice Award – Best Website 
 2012 Kidscreen Awards – Finalist, Best Companion Website 
 2012 Cynopsis: Kids !magination Awards – Honorable Mention, Website for a TV Series or TV Special 
 2012 Webby Awards – Website, Official Honoree 
 2011 – Nomination, Outstanding Performer in an Animated Program (Martin Short)
 2011 Daytime Emmy Awards – Nomination, Outstanding Original Song in Children's & Animation 
 2011 NAPPA Awards – "Told from the Cold" (DVD NCircle Entertainment) 
 2011 WGC Screenwriting Awards – Winner, Animation 
 2011 Young Artist Awards – Nominated, Best Performance in a Voice-Over, TV or Feature Film Young Actor 
 2011 Young Artist Awards – Nominated, Best Performance in a Voice-Over, TV or Feature Film Young Actress 
 2011 Youth Media Alliance – Nomination, Award of Excellence, Animation Three to Five Years 
 2010 Parents' Choice Awards – Recommended Seal

References

External links
 
 
 

2010s American animated television series
2010s American children's comedy television series
2010 American television series debuts
2018 American television series endings
2010s British animated television series
2010s British children's television series
2010 British television series debuts
2018 British television series endings
2010s Canadian animated television series
2010s Canadian children's television series
2010 Canadian television series debuts
2018 Canadian television series endings
2010s preschool education television series
American children's animated adventure television series
American children's animated comedy television series
American flash animated television series
American preschool education television series
American television shows based on children's books
Animated preschool education television series
Animated television series about cats
Animated television series about children
British children's animated adventure television series
British children's animated comedy television series
British flash animated television series
British preschool education television series
British television shows based on children's books
Canadian children's animated adventure television series
Canadian children's animated comedy television series
Canadian flash animated television series
Canadian preschool education television series
Canadian television shows based on children's books
English-language television shows
PBS original programming
PBS Kids shows
Treehouse TV original programming
CBC Kids original programming
Television shows based on works by Dr. Seuss
Television series by Corus Entertainment
The Cat in the Hat